Bytowo may refer to:
Bytowo, Choszczno County, Poland
Bytowo, Stargard County, Poland